Dierogekko baaba also known as Grande Terre striped gecko, is a gecko endemic to Grande Terre in New Caledonia.

References

Dierogekko
Reptiles described in 2014
Taxa named by Phillip Skipwith
Taxa named by Aaron M. Bauer
Taxa named by Todd R. Jackman
Taxa named by Ross Allen Sadlier
Taxa named by Anthony Whitaker
Geckos of New Caledonia